Chak Dewan Lakhimandass  is a village in the tehsil Beerwah of the district Budgam of the Jammu and Kashmir in India.

References 

Villages in Beerwah tehsil